Ankit Gupta (born 6 November 1988) is an Indian actor who is known for working in Hindi television. He is best known for his role as Fateh Singh Virk in Colors TV's Udaariyaan. In 2022, he appeared in Bigg Boss 16 as a contestant.

He is also known for his role as Parth Kashyap in Sadda Haq, and Garv Priyom Thakur in Begusarai.

Early life 
Gupta was born on 6 November 1988 in Meerut, Uttar Pradesh. He completed his education at IPEC Engineering College.

Career
He started his career by doing a job at a call center and later moved to Mumbai, where he did many commercials and music videos before he started acting.

Gupta made his acting debut in 2012, as Dr. Abhishek Kumar in Colors TV series Balika Vadhu. The same year, he was seen as Nalender Yadav in the Hindi film Tutiya Dil. In 2014, he rose to fame playing Parth Kashyap in Channel V India's show Sadda Haq.

Gupta was seen playing recurring roles in Begusarai as Garv Thakur, Kuch Rang Pyar Ke Aise Bhi as Jatin Roy, Mayavi Maling as Chegu and, Kundali Bhagya as Pawan Malhotra. He has also been part of the web series Illegal - Justice, Out of Order, Bekaboo 2, and Main Hero Boll Raha Hu.
From 2021 to 2022, Gupta was seen playing the male lead, Fateh Singh Virk, in Colors TV's popular drama Udaariyaan. In 2022, he was seen participating in the Colors TV's reality show Bigg Boss 16, and got evicted on day 84.

Since February 2023, Gupta is seen playing Jahaan, a musician, in Colors TV's romantic musical drama Junooniyatt.

Filmography

Films

Television

Special appearances

Web series

Music videos

Awards and nominations

See also
 List of Indian actors
 List of Indian television actors

References

External links
 

Living people
Indian television actors
Indian male television actors
Indian male soap opera actors
21st-century Indian male actors
Male actors in Hindi television
1988 births
Indian male models
Male actors from Uttar Pradesh
People from Meerut